Fran O'Brien (born 7 April 1955) is an Irish footballer who played during the 1970s and 1980s. He was the first player to be capped for the Republic of Ireland playing in U.S., earning a total of four caps. He now coaches for the premier club, PacNW, in Seattle WA.

Player
He won a league winners medal with Bohemians in 1974/75. During his career with Bohs, Fran made 62 league appearances with 1 goal and 8 appearances in European competition scoring 1 goal. In 1978, O'Brien moved along with Pat Byrne and Eddie Byrne to the Philadelphia Fury of the North American Soccer League (NASL). When the Fury moved to Montreal after the 1980 season, O'Brien went with the team and spent the next two seasons with the renamed Montreal Manic. In 1983, he signed with the Vancouver Whitecaps and spent the next two season with them. He was selected as an NASL all-star Honorable Mention for the 1983 season and was a second team selection with the Whitecaps in 1984. When the NASL folded at the end of the 1984 season, O'Brien signed with the Dallas Sidekicks of Major Indoor Soccer League (MISL). The Sidekicks released him on 10 September 1985 and he moved to the Tacoma Stars. He spent two seasons with the Stars before retiring and settling in Washington state. HE also played with the Hamilton Steelers.

Coach
He is the current head coach of Tacoma Tide of the amateur USL Premier Development League in the United States

He is also a coach for premier club, PacNW, in Seattle Washington.

He is the father of Leighton O'Brien and Ciaran O'Brien, brother of Derek O'Brien and the uncle of Mark O'Brien.

Honours
League of Ireland: 1
 Bohemians - 1974/75
FAI Cup: 1
 Bohemians - 1976

References

External links
 History of the Fury with photo of O'Brien
 Dallas Sidekicks profile
 NASL/MISL stats

1955 births
Living people
Association footballers from Dublin (city)
American Professional Soccer League players
Bohemian F.C. players
Canadian Soccer League (1987–1992) players
Dallas Sidekicks (original MISL) players
Expatriate soccer players in Canada
Expatriate soccer players in the United States
Seattle Storm (soccer) players
Hamilton Steelers (1981–1992) players
League of Ireland players
League of Ireland XI players
Irish expatriate sportspeople in Canada
Irish expatriate sportspeople in the United States
Major Indoor Soccer League (1978–1992) players
Montreal Manic players
North American Soccer League (1968–1984) players
North American Soccer League (1968–1984) indoor players
Philadelphia Fury (1978–1980) players
Republic of Ireland football managers
Republic of Ireland association footballers
Republic of Ireland expatriate association footballers
Republic of Ireland international footballers
Tacoma Stars players
Vancouver Whitecaps (1974–1984) players
Western Soccer Alliance players
Association football midfielders